Bdellomicrovirus is a genus of viruses, in the family Microviridae, in the subfamily Gokushovirinae. Bdellovibrio bacteria serve as natural hosts. There are two species in this genus.

Structure
Viruses in Bdellomicrovirus are non-enveloped, with icosahedral and  Round geometries, and T=1 symmetry. The diameter is around 30 nm. Genomes are circular, around 4.5kb in length.

Life cycle
Viral replication is cytoplasmic. Entry into the host cell is achieved by pilus-mediated adsorption into the host cell. Replication follows the ssDNA rolling circle model. DNA templated transcription is the method of transcription. The virus exits the host cell by bacteria lysis.
Bdellovibrio bacteria serve as the natural host.

References

External links
 Viralzone: Bdellomicrovirus
 ICTV

Gokushovirinae
Virus genera